OKO.press is a Polish investigative journalism website created on 15 June 2016. The name is a word play on oko, Polish for eye, and an abbreviation for "Ośrodek Kontroli Obywatelskiej" (Centre for Civic Control).

OKO.press is funded by a mix of individual donations and grants, with no revenue from advertising. The site aims to promote democratic values, human rights and transparency of government by publishing fact-finding, research and analysis.

In 2020, the website received the Index on Censorship journalism award.

Creation 
OKO.press was founded in June 2016, through the Fundacja Ośrodek Kontroli Obywatelskiej "OKO" editors originating from the Polish media company Agora, as a non-profit investigative journalism website. OKO.press journalists initially included journalists from Gazeta Wyborcza, Polityka, TVN, and from the Agora regional news station Tok FM. The website is financed through individual donations and grants. In 2019, its income consisted of 80% individual donations and 20% grants. 93% of the readers are from Poland, the rest are mainly from Germany, Great Britain and the United States.

Editorial line 
OKO.press describes its aims as investigative journalism, fact-checking of public debate, and stimulating discussion of important themes in the Internet. It states that it promotes democratic values, human rights and government transparency. OKO.press says that it follows twelve fact-checking principles modelled on the United States project PolitiFact.

OKO.Press has debunked far-right conspiracy theories on Islam in Europe. Academic historian and OKO.press commentator Adam Leszczyński debunked far-right politician Robert Winnicki's comments on Islamic colonisation in 2016. In 2017, deputy editor Bianka Mikołajewska fact-checked a right-wing commentator Tomasz Łysiak's statements that the national independence march did not have tens of thousands of far-right extremists and fascists marching. On review of photographic evidence, Mikołajewska debunked Łysiak's statement, showing significant prevalence of far-right slogans and symbols such as the Nazi flag, Polish eagle, and celtic cross. These two instances of debunking far-right propaganda on Islam exhibits an association with peace journalism.

OKO.press has been including on Duke University Reporters’ Lab list of fact checkers. Widely popular in Poland, in 2020 it was ranked seventh amongst the most authoritative web portals, and first within the new online brands.

International response 
OKO.press has an international reputation as an "acclaimed", "well-known investigative journalism outlet".

Lawsuits 
Between 2018 and 2020 seven vexatious lawsuits by politicians, companies, and business people have been filed against OKO.press. In reaction to the 2 April 2020 publication of the article It is better to avoid the museum. What Minister Gliński did with the memory of the Second World War, a lawsuit was filed against OKO.press. The founder and editor-in-chief of OKO.press, Piotr Pacewicz, described the lawsuit as an attack on the freedom of the press and media.

Awards 
In December 2016, the deputy chief editor of OKO.press, Bianka Mikołajewska, was awarded the 2016  award for "courage in facing new challenges and journalistic accuracy" and "good, hard journalistic work in sticking to the facts ... rather than repeating their interpretation".

In early 2020, OKO.press was shortlisted for the Index on Censorship Freedom of Expression Awards, along with Hong Kong Free Press, SOS Médias Burundi and Venezuelan journalist Marco Ruiz Silvera. On 16 April 2020, Index on Censorship named OKO.press as the winner, justifying its choice for OKO.press being "one of the first free investigative journalism and fact-checking websites in Poland", for its journalistic work "[paving] the way for other news sources to follow suit", "fighting for immunity from government propaganda", and being "crucial in an environment sliding further and further into authoritarianism and censorship".

In September 2020, OKO.press received the Equality Crowns media award from Campaign Against Homophobia for "analyzing the events concerning the LGBT community in Poland carefully and with dedication".

References

External links
 

Fact-checking websites
Internet properties established in 2016
Polish news websites
Watchdog journalism
2016 establishments in Poland